Polyandrocarpa is a genus of ascidian tunicates in the family Styelidae.

Species within the genus Polyandrocarpa include:
 Polyandrocarpa abjornseni (Michaelsen, 1928) 
 Polyandrocarpa anguinea (Sluiter, 1898)
 Polyandrocarpa arianae Monniot, 2016 
 Polyandrocarpa australiensis Kott, 1952 
 Polyandrocarpa chendurensis Renganathan & Krishnaswamy, 1985 
 Polyandrocarpa colemani Kott, 1992 
 Polyandrocarpa colligata Sluiter, 1913 
 Polyandrocarpa durbanensis Millar, 1955 
 Polyandrocarpa glandulosa Monniot, 1987 
 Polyandrocarpa gravei Van Name, 1931 
 Polyandrocarpa griffithsi Monniot, Monniot, Griffiths & Schleyer, 2001 
 Polyandrocarpa lapidosa (Herdman, 1891) 
 Polyandrocarpa misakiensis Watanabe & Tokioka, 1972 
 Polyandrocarpa oligocarpa Millar, 1970 
 Polyandrocarpa ordinata Monniot, 1983 
 Polyandrocarpa pilella (Herdman, 1881) 
 Polyandrocarpa placenta (Herdman, 1886) 
 Polyandrocarpa polypora Monniot & Monniot, 2001 
 Polyandrocarpa robusta Sluiter, 1919 
 Polyandrocarpa rollandi Tokioka, 1961 
 Polyandrocarpa sabanillae Van Name, 1921 
 Polyandrocarpa sagamiensis Tokioka, 1953 
 Polyandrocarpa shimodensis Brunetti, 2007 
 Polyandrocarpa simulans Kott, 1972 
 Polyandrocarpa sparsa Kott, 1985 
 Polyandrocarpa tarona Monniot & Monniot, 1987 
 Polyandrocarpa triggiensis Kott, 1952 
 Polyandrocarpa watsonia Kott, 1985 
 Polyandrocarpa zorritensis (Van Name, 1931)

Species names currently considered to be synonyms:
 Polyandrocarpa floridana Van Name, 1921: synonym of Eusynstyela floridana (Van Name, 1921) 
 Polyandrocarpa inhacae Millar, 1956: synonym of Stolonica inhacae (Millar, 1956) 
 Polyandrocarpa latericius (Sluiter, 1904): synonym of Eusynstyela latericius (Sluiter, 1904) 
 Polyandrocarpa latericuis (Sluiter, 1904): synonym of Eusynstyela latericius (Sluiter, 1904) 
 Polyandrocarpa maxima (Sluiter, 1904): synonym of Polyandrocarpa anguinea (Sluiter, 1898) 
 Polyandrocarpa monotestis Tokioka, 1953: synonym of Eusynstyela monotestis (Tokioka, 1953) 
 Polyandrocarpa nigricans (Heller, 1878): synonym of Polycarpa nigricans Heller, 1878 
 Polyandrocarpa nivosa Sluiter, 1898: synonym of Polycarpa anguinea (Sluiter, 1898) 
 Polyandrocarpa stolonifera Kawamura & Watanabe, 1981: synonym of Monandrocarpa stolonifera Monniot, 1970 
 Polyandrocarpa tenera : synonym of Polycarpa tenera Lacaze-Duthiers & Delage, 1892 
 Polyandrocarpa tincta (Van Name, 1902): synonym of Eusynstyela tincta (Van Name, 1902) 
 Polyandrocarpa transversalis Tokioka, 1963: synonym of Eusynstyela transversalis (Tokioka, 1963) 
 Polyandrocarpa violacea Sluiter, 1905: synonym of Eusynstyela hartmeyeri Michaelsen, 1904 
 Polyandrocarpa wastonia Kott, 1985: synonym of Polyandrocarpa watsonia Kott, 1985

References

Stolidobranchia
Tunicate genera